Kanishchev is a Russian masculine surname, its feminine counterpart is Kanishcheva. It may refer to
Alexander Kanishchev (born 1960), Soviet football player
Aleksandr Kanishchev (footballer, born 1998), Russian football player
Anatoli Kanishchev (born 1971), Russian association football player
Pavel Kanishchev (born 1986), Russian extremist, chairman of Eurasian Youth Union

Russian-language surnames